Nishad is the seventh svara from the seven svaras of Hindustani music and Carnatic music. Nishad is the long form of the syllable नी. For simplicity in pronouncing while singing the syllable, Nishad is pronounced as Ni (notation - N). It is also called as निषाद in the Devanagri script.

Details

The following is the information about Nishada and its importance in Indian classical music :

 Nishad is the seventh svara in an octave or Saptak.
 Nishad is the immediate next svara of Dhaivat (Dha).
 The svara of Nishad is Komal and Shuddha.
 It is said that Shadja is the basic svara from which all the other 6 svaras are produced. When we break the word Shadja then we get, Shad And Ja. It means that Shad is 6 and ja is 'giving birth' in Marathi. So basically the translation is :
  षड् - 6, ज -जन्म . Therefore, it collectively means giving birth to the other six notes of the music.
So the svara Ni is formed from Shadja.
 The frequency of Nishad is 450 Hz. The frequencies of the seven svaras are also given below: Sa 240 Hz, Re 270 Hz, Ga 300 Hz, Ma 320 Hz, Pa 360 Hz, Dha 400 Hz, and Ni 450 Hz, Sa 480 Hz (Taar Saptak) ........ (and so on).
Consequently, the Ni after the Dha of 900 Hz (Taar Saptak) has a frequency of 800 Hz i.e. the double of the Lower octave Ni.
 There are  Shruti's of Nishad. Previously the main Shruti, not only for Ni but for all the other svaras, was on the last Shruti but now it is considered to be on the 1st Shurti.
For example, if these are the 2 Shruti's of Ni then,

                  Previously this was the position of the main Shruti of Ni.
                  ^ 
              1   2
              ^
              But now this position has become the main Shruti of Ni.
 All the other svaras except Shadja (Sa) and Pancham (Pa) can be  or  svaras but Sa and Pa are always Shuddha svaras. And hence svaras Sa and Pa are called Achal Svaras, since these svaras don't move from their original position. Svaras Ra, Ga, Ma, Dha, Ni are called Chal Svaras, since these svaras move from their original position.
    
     Sa, Re, Ga, Ma, Pa, Dha, Ni - Shuddha Svaras
    
     Re, Ga, Dha, Ni -  
   
     Ma - 
 Ragas from Khamaj Thaat, Kafi Thaat, Asavari Thaat and Bhairavi Thaat have Komal Nishad, rest of the thaats have Shuddha Nishad.
 Ragas where Ni is the Vadi svara - Raga Jaunpuri, Raga Tilang, etc. Ragas where Ni is the Samvadi svara - Raga Purvi,  Raga Yaman, etc.
 Hypothetically speaking, Ni is said to be Nirakar Bhrama, Nirakar Bhrama as in, the three main gods, Bhrama, Vishnu and Shiva were first created i.e. Sakar Bhrama (Sa) and then these three gods created Rishimuni i.e. Re and then Gandharvas were created for singing and then lord Indra or Raja Indra i.e. Mahipal was created and once the Mahipal (Raja) or the king was created, the Praja or the common citizens or the people were made, and as people have their own Dharma or duty/religion, the religion was made, when religion was made the Nirakar form of Bhrama is formed i.e. Dharma created the Nirakar form of Bhrama (Ni). Ni is made the acronym of Nirakar Bhrama for showing the importance of the syllable Ni. So it started with Sakar Bhrama (Sa) and ends with Nirakar Bhrama (Ni). 
 Nishad is said to be sourced from the trumpeting of the elephant.
 Nishad is associated with the planet Venus. 
 Nishad is associated with Multi colours.

See also
 List of Ragas in Hindustani classical music
 Svara
 Shadja (Sa)
 Rishabh (Re)
 Gandhar (Ga)
 Madhyam (Ma)
 Pancham (Pa)
 Dhaivat (Dha)

Ni (svara)

References

Hindustani music
Carnatic music
Hindustani music terminology
Carnatic music terminology